More Friends Over is the third studio album by Japanese singer Erina Mano.

Details 
The album was released on 28 March 2012 in Japan under the label hachama. It reached the 27th place in the ranking of Oricon sales. It also comes in a limited edition with a different cover and a DVD containing extra video clips and making-of.

The album contains five tracks: eleven songs and four interludes, two of the songs were already previously released as singles in 2011: Seishun no Serenade and My Days for You. Those of single Doki Doki Baby/Tasogare Kosaten released the previous month are not included (but on the compilation Best Friends in 2013), although the making of his wallet and one of his video clip shown on the DVD.

This is her last studio album under Hello!Project.

Track listing

References

External links 
 Official album profile
 Album profile in Hello!Projet website

2012 albums
Erina Mano albums